Elections to Liverpool City Council were held on Thursday 1 November 1895. 
This was an 'all up' election following boundary changes which extended the area of the city and increased the number of wards from 16 to 28. 
Three councillors were elected for each ward. 
The candidate with the most votes was elected for three years, 
the candidate with the second highest number of votes was elected for two years
and the candidate with the third highest number of votes was elected for one year.

After the election, the composition of the council was:

Election result

Ward results

* - Retiring Councillor seeking re-election

Abercromby

A parish ward, formerly Abercromby and part of Rodney Street ward.

Breckfield

Formerly part of Everton and Kirkdale ward.

Brunswick

Formerly part of the Toxteth Park ward.

Castle Street

Parish ward

{{Election box candidate with party link|
  |party      = Conservative Party (UK)
  |candidate  = William Bartlett
  |votes      = 796
  |percentage = ''36%  |change     = N/A
}}

Dingle

Formerly part of Toxteth Park ward

Edge Hill

formerly part of West Derby ward.

Everton

formerly part of Everton and Kirkdale ward.

Exchange

Parish ward.

Fairfield

Granby

formerly part of Toxteth Park ward.

Great George

Parish ward. Formerly Great George plus part of Rodney Street ward.

Kensington

formerly part of West Derby ward.

Kirkdale

Formerly part of Everton and Kirkdale ward.

Low Hill

Formerly part of West Derby ward.

Netherfield

Formerly part of Everton and Kirkdale ward.

North Scotland

Parish ward.

North Walton

Prince's Park

Sandhills

Formerly part of Everton and Kirkdale ward.

St. Anne's

Parish ward. Formerly St. Anne Street plus Lime Street.

St. Domingo

Formerly part of Everton and Kirkdale ward.

St. Peter's

Parish ward. Formerly St. Peters plus Pitt Street wards.

Sefton Park

South Scotland

Parish ward.

South Walton

Vauxhall

Parish ward. Formerly Vauxhall plus St. Pauls.

Wavertree

West Derby

Aldermanic Elections

Following the expiry of the terms of office  of eight aldermen at the Council meeting 
on 9 November 1895 the following were elected as aldermen by the Council, according 
to the provisions of the Municipal Corporation Act, 1882.*''' re-elected alderman

Six additional aldermen were elected by the Council following nominations by the Urban District Councils of the added areas, under section 7 of the Local Government Board's Provisional Order Confirmation (No. 10) Act, 1895.

Six additional aldermen were elected by the Council pursuant to the Local Government Board's Provisional Order Confirmation (No. 10) Act, 1895.

By-elections

No.7, St. Domingo

Caused by the election of Councillor John Houlding (Conservative, St. Domingo, elected 1 November 1895) as an alderman by the Council on 9 November 1895.

No. 10, Low Hill

Caused by the election of Councillor Ephraim Walker (Conservative, Low Hill, elected 1 November 1896) as an alderman by the Council on 9 November 1895.

No. 12, Edge Hill

Caused by the election of Councillor Edward Hatton Cookson (Conservative, Edge Hill, elected 1 November 1895) as an alderman by the Council on 9 November 1895.

No. 18, Castle Street

Caused by the election of Councillors William Bartlett (Conservative, Castle Street, elected 1 November 1895) and Joseph Bond Morgan (Conservative, Castle Street, elected 1 November 1895) as an alderman by the Council on 9 November 1895.

No. 21, Abercromby

Caused by the election of Councillor Thomas Menlove (Conservative, Abercromby, elected 1 November 1895) as an alderman by the Council on 9 November 1895.

No. 26, Dingle

Caused by the election of Councillor Joseph Ball (Conservative, Dingle, elected 1 November 1895) as an alderman by the Council on 9 November 1895.

No. 17, St. Anne's, 17 December 1895

Alderman Philip Henry Rathbone died on 22 November 1895.

In his place, Councillor Jeremiah Miles (Liberal, St. Anne's, elected 1 November 1895) was elected as an alderman by the Council on 4 December 1895

.

No. 18, Castle Street, 19 February 1896

Following the death of Alderman Henry Charles Hawley on 8 January 1896
,
Councillor Henry Hugh Hornby JP (Liberal Unionist, Castle Street, elected 1 November 1895) was elected by the Council as an alderman on 5 February 1896

, necessitating a by-election in the Castle Street ward.

No. 10, Low Hill, 15 March 1896

Caused by the resignation of Councillor Charles Stewart Dean (Conservative, Low Hill, elected 1 November 1895), which was reported to the Council on 4 March 1896.

No.17, St. Anne's, 16 June 1896

Caused by the resignation of Councillor Richard Ripley (Conservative, St. Anne's, elected 1 November 1895) was reported to the Council on 3 June 1896
.

See also

 Liverpool City Council
 Liverpool Town Council elections 1835 - 1879
 Liverpool City Council elections 1880–present
 Mayors and Lord Mayors of Liverpool 1207 to present
 History of local government in England

References

1895
1895 English local elections
November 1895 events
1890s in Liverpool